Deq or xal are the traditional and unique tattoos pertaining to Kurds. Deq is more commonly found among Kurdish women, but is also observed among men. However, the practice of deq has become less common due to the influence of Islam and has been substituted with henna. Unlike the henna, deq is not temporary. Efforts have been made to revitalize the usage of deq as a way of reasserting one's Kurdish identity. Deq is also practiced by Yazidis and to a higher degree.

History 
The origins of deq are unknown.

In the early 6th century, Aëtius of Amida wrote about the deq and how it was prepared which he published in his work Medicae Artis Principes. In this work, he explained that the deq material was prepared by crushing and mixing pine wood (preferably its bark), some corroded bronze, gum and oil from trees. Beside this mixture, corroded bronze was also mixed with vinegar to create a second mixture. Then, leek juice and water is mixed together. The place for the tattoo is then cleaned by this leek juice mixture, a design is drawn by piercing and the combined mixture is then put on the skin.

Jacques de Morgan also observed the tattooing of Kurdish women in 1895, and mentioned that old women had most tattoos and were sometimes tattooed all over the body. When men were tattooed, it was predominantly on their hands and rarely on the face. Henry Field also observed this phenomenon when he visited the provinces of Kurdistan and Kermanshah in Iran in the 1950s.

Signification and usage 
The practice of deq predates Islam and is associated with local traditions. They can have different significations depending on placement, including pure adornment, spiritual protection and tribal affiliation. On women, they are usually found on faces, necks, feet, hands and to a lesser degree breasts and near the genitals. Facial deq is believed to ward off evil spirits, provide good health and fertility. There are rules to the usage of deq and women who are divorced or who have given birth to stillborn children cannot be tattooed.

In inking women, the tattooist first draws the design on the skin with a needle dipped in ink and pricked into the skin. The ink is made from milk (usually breast milk) and designs are usually lines, stars, swastikas, suns, semicircles, rectangles, diamonds and crosses. It is circles that are particularly associated with fertility, while crosses are believed to ward off evil spirits and diamonds bring strength. The deq can be seen as a diary for the particular woman.

Men usually get tattooed on the hands, legs, neck, chest and face (temporal tattoos are common). The primary significations among men are medicinal and protective.

In the past, it was possible to identify the tribal affiliation of a Kurd by their deq.

Patterns among Yazidis 
Patterns among the Yazidis include a comb, a cross, a gazelle, an animal called daqqayeh, a sandgrouse foot, a moon (both full or crescent), a doll, a spindle, an inverted 'v' called res daqq and a dimlich (figure which looks like a bag with two strings).

References

Further reading 

 
 

Kurdish culture
Tattooing traditions
Yazidi traditions
Kurdish words and phrases